Casey's Contraptions is an iOS game developed by American studios Snappy Touch and Mystery Coconut, and released May 19, 2011.

Rovio Entertainment bought the game IP rights in May 2012, and rebranded it as Amazing Alex.

Reception

The game has a rating of 89/100 on Metacritic based on 11 critic reviews.

Tap! said "If elaborate construction is what you had in mind, check out the more scholarly - not to mention free - Tinkerbox. But for when you want fun firing catapults at dolls to knock bowling balls onto see-saws, Casey's your man."

External links

References

2011 video games
Android (operating system) games
IOS games
Puzzle video games
Video games developed in the United States
Single-player video games